Alena Bartošová (born September 17, 1944) is a former Czechoslovakian cross-country skier who competed during the 1970s. She won a bronze medal in the 4 × 5 km relay at the 1974 FIS Nordic World Ski Championships in Falun.

She was born in Pipice. Her best olympic placing was sixth twice in the 4 × 5 km relay events at the 1972 Winter Olympics and in the 1976 Winter Olympics in Innsbruck.

Cross-country skiing results

Olympic Games

World Championships
 1 medal – (1 bronze)

External links
World Championship results 

1944 births
Living people
Czech female cross-country skiers
People from Semily District
Olympic cross-country skiers of Czechoslovakia
Cross-country skiers at the 1972 Winter Olympics
Cross-country skiers at the 1976 Winter Olympics
FIS Nordic World Ski Championships medalists in cross-country skiing
Sportspeople from the Liberec Region